Michael Learned (born April 9, 1939) is an American actor, known for her role as Olivia Walton in the long-running CBS drama series The Waltons (1972–1981). She has won the Primetime Emmy Award for Outstanding Lead Actress in a Drama Series four times, which is tied for the record of most wins with Tyne Daly. Three of the wins were for The Waltons (1973, 1974, 1976), while the other was for Nurse (1982).

Early life
Learned was born in Washington, D.C., the eldest daughter of Elizabeth Duane "Betti" (née Hooper) and Bruce Learned, a diplomat. Her maternal grandfather was an attaché for the United States Embassy in Rome. She has five younger sisters: Gretl, Susan, Sabra, Dorit and Philippa.

She lived on a Connecticut farm for the first 10 years of her life. Learned said that her parents never explained why she received a masculine first name, once saying of her father: "All he told me was that if I had been a boy, I would have been named Caleb, but I was a girl, so I was called Michael."

When she was 11, Learned moved to Austria, where her father worked for the U.S. State Department. At this time, she attended Arts Educational School, Tring, now Tring Park School for the Performing Arts in Tring, Hertfordshire, England. During this time, she discovered the theater and decided to make acting her life's work.

Career

Television and film
Her first substantial role in either film or television was as Olivia Walton on The Waltons, which ran for nine seasons from 1972 to 1981. For the first five seasons of the show she was billed as "Miss Michael Learned" because she was relatively unknown at the time and producers wished to avoid confusion among viewers about her gender. By the sixth season, as the show continued its success after the departure of co-star Richard Thomas, producers' fear of confusion about her sex had been alleviated and the "Miss" was removed from Learned's billing. She was nominated for six Emmy Awards as Lead Actress in a Drama, winning three times. After the end of the sixth season, she agreed to appear for one more season on the condition that she would not have to work the full nine months. After the seventh season she left the show.

Her character's abrupt disappearance was explained by Olivia developing tuberculosis and entering a sanatorium in Arizona. She made occasional guest appearances until the show's cancelation and later appeared in four of the six Waltons reunion movies made during the 1980s and 1990s. For her portrayal of Olivia Walton, Learned was nominated for four Golden Globe Awards. During her run as Olivia Walton, Learned and The Waltons co-star, Will Geer, appeared together in the 1974 made-for-TV movie Hurricane.

Learned made her big screen debut in 1980, playing the supporting role in the drama film Touched by Love. She later appeared in Power (1986) and Dragon: The Bruce Lee Story (1993), and well as number of made-for-television movies.

Learned starred as Nurse Mary Benjamin in the hospital drama Nurse, which ran on CBS for six episodes in spring 1981 and then for the 1981–1982 seasons. Though the series was well received critically, it was not a ratings success and lasted only two partial seasons. Nevertheless, Learned was nominated for two Emmy Awards for Outstanding Lead Actress and won yet another Emmy for this role in 1982. She later had starring roles in the unsuccessful 1988 drama Hothouse and 1989 sitcom Living Dolls and reprised her Waltons role for a number of television movies and reunions in the 1990s.

In 2005, Learned played Judge Helen Turner on the ABC soap operas All My Children and One Life to Live as part of the "baby switch" storyline on both shows. In the second season of The Secret World of Alex Mack, she guest-starred as a ghost who regretted the decisions of her long-estranged granddaughter, revealed at the end to be the show's main villain, Danielle Atron (Louan Gideon). She guest-starred in Scrubs as Mrs. Wilk in five episodes from the show's fifth season. She played Shirley Smith on ABC's General Hospital in 2010. In late 2011, Learned played Katherine Chancellor on the CBS daytime soap opera, The Young and the Restless, filling in for Jeanne Cooper, who was on extended medical leave from the series.

In 2022, Learned made her return to television with starring role in the Netflix limited series, Dahmer – Monster: The Jeffrey Dahmer Story playing Catherine Dahmer, Jeffrey Dahmer's grandmother.

Theatre
In the late 1960s, Learned and her husband Peter Donat appeared in various roles with the American Conservatory Theater in San Francisco. She has appeared in many stage productions on Broadway, off Broadway, and elsewhere, including the 2006–2007 national touring production of On Golden Pond. In the fall of 2008, she starred in Innovation Theatre Works' production of Driving Miss Daisy, playing the title role of Daisy Werthen opposite Willis Burks II as Hoke and Dirk Blocker as Daisy's son Boolie. She reprised the role opposite Lance E. Nichols as Hoke at Judson Theatre Company in March 2013.

Personal life
Learned has been married four times. Her first husband was Canadian-American actor Peter Donat, whom she married in 1956 when she was 17 years old. The marriage was dissolved in 1972. She had three sons by the marriage—Caleb, Christopher, and Lucas Donat.

Her second marriage, to Glen Chadwick, lasted from 1974 to 1977 and ended in divorce. In 1979, she married actor-screenwriter William Parker. That marriage ended in divorce as well. Since 1988, she has been married to lawyer John Doherty; the couple resides in California.

In a 2002 article she wrote for Daily Word, a publication of the Unity Church, Learned states that at the time she was cast in The Waltons, she had "hit rock bottom". Then, at age 32, Learned realized she was an alcoholic. Taking herself to former husband Peter Donat's cabin on the California coast, she decided to "get sober" and that her time there was the beginning of a spiritual journey. Learned further stated in the article that she has been sober since 1977.

Filmography

Film

Television films

Television series

References

External links

Image of Robert L. Jacks, Michael Learned, Richard Thomas and Lee Rich with their Emmys for "The Waltons," Los Angeles, California, 1973. Los Angeles Times Photographic Archive (Collection 1429). UCLA Library Special Collections, Charles E. Young Research Library, University of California, Los Angeles.

1939 births
Living people
20th-century American actresses
21st-century American actresses
Actresses from Washington, D.C.
American film actresses
American soap opera actresses
American stage actresses
American television actresses
Outstanding Performance by a Lead Actress in a Drama Series Primetime Emmy Award winners
People educated at Tring Park School for the Performing Arts
Actresses from Connecticut
The Waltons